Ambalappuzha railway station (code: AMPA) is a railway station in Alappuzha District, Kerala and falls under the Thiruvananthapuram railway division of the Southern Railway zone, Indian Railways. The station is a major station on the Ernakulam–Kayamkulam coastal railway line.  The station is operated by the Southern Railway zone of the Indian Railways and comes under the Thiruvananthapuram railway division.

Layout 
Alappuzha railway station has 3 platforms to handle long distance and passenger trains. Escalators inaugurated at PF#1 of Alappuzha Railway station

References

Railway stations in Alappuzha district
Railway stations opened in 1989
1989 establishments in Kerala